Minuscule 845 (in the Gregory-Aland numbering), ε412 (von Soden), is a 14th-century Greek minuscule manuscript of the New Testament on parchment. The manuscript has complex context.

Description 

The codex contains the text of the four Gospels on 315 parchment leaves (size ). The text is written in one column per page, 20 lines per page.

There is also a division according to the smaller Ammonian Sections, whose numbers are given at the margin, but without references to the Eusebian Canons.

Text 
The Greek text of the codex is a representative of the Byzantine text-type. Hermann von Soden classified it to the textual family Kr. Kurt Aland placed the Greek text of the codex in Category V.
According to the Claremont Profile Method it represents textual family Kr in Luke 1 and Luke 20, and creates textual pair with 588. In Luke 10 no profile was made.

The Pericope Adulterae (John 7:53-8:11) is marked by an obelus.

History 

According to the colophon it was written in 1330. Currently the manuscript is dated by the INTF to the 14th century.

The manuscript was added to the list of New Testament manuscripts by Gregory (845e). It was examined by Oscar von Gebhardt in 1882.

Currently the manuscript is housed at the Biblioteca Fabroniana (Ms. 307), in Pistoia.

See also 

 List of New Testament minuscules
 Biblical manuscript
 Textual criticism

References

Further reading 

 
 A. Turyn, Codices Graeci Vaticani saeculis XIII et XIV scripti, Codices e Vaticanis selecti 28 (Vatican, 1964), 142, 177ff.

External links 
 

Greek New Testament minuscules
14th-century biblical manuscripts